Patharwadi is a village in Parner taluka in Ahmednagar district of state of Maharashtra, India.

The Village Patharwadi is 2 km away from the famous village Nighoj, wherein Goddess Malaganga Temple is famous for worship. The population of Pataharwadi is between about 3000 to 3500.

In Patharwadi itself includes the small sections of Bodagewadi, Ghodoba vasti, Khillarwasti, Derul Mala etc. Most of the students study at Nighoj for their secondary education as there is only the Z. P primary school available in village. Nearly 10% of the total population is living in the city of Mumbai. Many of the people are highly educated and work as government servants, in their own businesses or in the private sector.
The village is famous for its Yatra and saptah.

Bodagewadi is also having temple of Malganaga Devi. The Famous Pot Holes of Nighoj is only 2 km distance from Bodagewadi
Bodagewadi is famous for Lezim Mandal & Kranti Yuva Group.

See also
 Parner taluka
 Villages in Parner taluka

References 

Villages in Parner taluka
Villages in Ahmednagar district